Kemsley Mathias (born 29 July 1999) is a Welsh rugby union player, currently playing for Pro14 and European Rugby Champions Cup side Scarlets. His preferred position is prop.

Scarlets
Mathias was named in the Scarlets first-team squad for the 2020–21 Pro14 season. He made his Scarlets debut in Round 11 of the 2020–21 Pro14 against Cardiff Blues.

References

External links
itsrugby.co.uk Profile

1999 births
Living people
Rugby union players from Haverfordwest
Rugby union props
Scarlets players
Welsh rugby union players